Kyrgyz Americans are Americans of Kyrgyz ethnicity. The majority of Kyrgyz Americans have emigrated to the United States from Kyrgyzstan, especially since the country gained independence from the Soviet Union in 1991.

History

Most Kyrgyz migrants moved to the United States in the late 20th century, following the break-up of the Soviet Union. Kyrgyz immigration to the United States was primarily driven by economic factors, particularily by economic instability in Kyrgyzstan following the collapse of the USSR.

The number of Kyrgyz immigrants living in the United States is estimated to be between 30,000 and 50,000 people. However, the exact number is difficult to determine as some Kyrgyz Americans may be undocumented migrants.

Kyrgyz Americans are primarily concentrated in several major cities in the United States, with Chicago being the most popular among them.

Organizations

Kyrgyz Americans have established several organizations to support and preserve their cultural heritage in the United States.

The Kyrgyz American Foundation is a non-profit organization based in New York. It was founded in 2019 with the aim of promoting and preserving Kyrgyz culture, heritage and language in the diaspora. The foundation provides a platform for Kyrgyz Americans to connect with each other, as well as with their ancestral homeland.

The Kyrgyz Community Center in Chicago is another important organization for Kyrgyz Americans. The center was established to serve as a hub for the Kyrgyz community in the Chicago area. It provides a space for community members to come together, host cultural events and celebrate their heritage. The center also serves as a resource for Kyrgyz Americans in the Chicago area, offering information on immigration, employment, and other practical matters.

Further reading
 Liebert, Saltanat, Stephen E. Condrey, and Dmitry Goncharov, eds. Public administration in post-communist countries: Former Soviet Union, Central and Eastern Europe, and Mongolia. CRC Press, 2013.

References

Ethnicity